

Gmina Jarocin is a rural gmina (administrative district) in Nisko County, Subcarpathian Voivodeship, in south-eastern Poland.

Villages 
Gmina Jarocin contains the villages and settlements of Domostawa, Golce, Jarocin, Katy, Kutyły, Majdan Golczański, Mostki, Szwedy, Szyperki and Ździary.

Neighbouring gminas 
Gmina Jarocin is bordered by the gminas of Harasiuki, Janów Lubelski, Pysznica and Ulanów.

References 

 Polish official population figures 2006

Jarocin
Gmina Jarocin